Dulhaniya London Se Layenge is a 2022 Bhojpuri language comedy drama film, written and directed by Rajnish Mishra. The films stars Khesari Lal Yadav, Madhu Sharma and British artist Grace Rhodes.

Plot 

Raja, an unemployed village boy, is shown traveling to London with his friend Godhan for a job. He had been told that the work would be paperwork, but he found that his friend worked as a cleaner in a British company. Since his parents had borrowed money to send him to London, he chose to work there instead of returning to India.

Radha, an Indian girl, runs away on the day of her marriage as she loves another. Her boyfriend sends her to London and promises her that he will come in a few days. At the airport, Raja sees Radha and tries to hit on her. When Radha reaches the landlord's place, she finds that Raja is also living there. Since Raja promises her that he will find a new place in few days, she agrees to stay with him.

Raja; while going to work; sees British girl Jenifer and falls in love with her. Radha helps him to impress Jenifer. Eventually Jenifer and Raja come into a relationship. One day Jenifer calls Raja at her place and asks him to make love with her. Raja declines, as he believes it should not be done before marriage, which leads to their breakup.

Raja helps Radha find a job where he works as Radha is out of money and her boyfriend makes excuses for not coming to London. While supporting each other, they develop feelings for each other. The day Raja decides to show his feelings for her, Radha's father comes to her place with her boyfriend. He asks her to return India, saying he will let her marry her boyfriend. She has to return as she can say again that now she loves someone else.

Raja's company head books his ticket to India and tells him to fight for her. Raja goes to India and starts searching for Radha's house. He sees Radha's boyfriend in a bridegroom's dress and a women in bride's dress sitting with him in a car. Later he founds out that that woman was not Radha, who had rejected that marriage, too, and his father kicked her out. She teaches at an orphanage. Radha goes there and finds her.

Cast 

 Khesari Lal Yadav, as Raja
 Madhu Sharma, as Radha
 Grace Rhodes, as Jenifer
 Ananjay Raghuraj

Release 
The film released on 13 May 2022 across India.

References 

2020s Bhojpuri-language films
2020s Indian films
2022 films
Indian comedy-drama films